Jarosław Żaczek (born 14 May  1967, in Ryki) is a Polish politician. He was elected to Sejm on 25 September 2005 after receiving 6246 votes in the 6 Lublin district as the Law and Justice candidate.

See also
Members of Polish Sejm 2005-2007

External links
Jarosław Żaczek - parliamentary page - includes declarations of interest, voting record, and transcripts of speeches.

1967 births
Living people
People from Ryki County
Members of the Polish Sejm 2005–2007
Law and Justice politicians
Members of the Polish Sejm 2007–2011